Domenico Maiese (born 5 January 1991) is an Italian footballer who plays as a defender.

Career

Early career
Born in Vallo della Lucania, Campania, Maiese joined Internazionale in 2004. He played from Giovanissimi Regionali under-14 team in 2004–05 season to Allievi Regionali under-16 team in 2006–07 season.

On 31 August 2007 he left for Pro Sesto Allievi Nazionali under-17 team, rejoining Inter teammates Cristiano Biraghi, Marco Puntoriere and Giovanni Kyeremateng (left in January).

In the next season he left for Monza along with G.Kyeremateng, Paolo Campinoti, Nicolò De Cesare, Luca D'Errico, Mirko Santoro, Davide Tremolada, Stefano Tresoldi, Maximiliano Uggè, Niccolò Scaccabarozzi and Francesco Poltero (since January). He finished as the runner-up of Berretti under-20 team.

In August 2009 Monza bought him outright (for free) along with 9 other Inter players. Maiese then left for Serie D club PontIsola on loan.

He was released in June 2010. On 2 September he left for another Serie D club Asti.

Lecco
On 26 July 2011 he left for Lecco. Maiese made his league debut on 4 September. He only missed a few game, to injury in round 8; suspended in round 10 and on the bench in round 13 and 14. He was substituted by Luca Viviani in the first half against Bellaria on 27 November and on 5 December 2011 his contract was terminated. Before he was released by Lecco, he still played for the first team in practice match against the reserve. However, he was not included in the match against Mantova F.C. on 4 December.

Honours
Inter youth
 Campionato Giovanissimi Nazionali: 2006

Monza youth
 Campionato Nazionale Dante Berretti Runner-up: 2009

References

External links
 LaSerieD.com Profile 
 Lecco Profile 
 

Italian footballers
Inter Milan players
S.S.D. Pro Sesto players
A.C. Monza players
Calcio Lecco 1912 players
Association football fullbacks
Sportspeople from the Province of Salerno
1991 births
Living people
A.C. Ponte San Pietro Isola S.S.D. players
Footballers from Campania